Robert Panapa Tutaki  (1887 – 27 September 1957), also known as Tutaki Panapa Stewart and Robert Tutaki Panapa, was a New Zealand  shearer and trade unionist.

Of Māori descent, he identified with the Ngāti Kahungunu iwi. He was born in Ruahapia, Hawke's Bay, New Zealand, in about 1887.

In the 1949 King's Birthday Honours, Tutaki was appointed a Member of the Order of the British Empire for services in connection with the organisation of Māori shearers during World War II.

References

1880s births
1957 deaths
New Zealand trade unionists
People from the Hawke's Bay Region
Ngāti Kahungunu people
New Zealand sheep shearers
Unsuccessful candidates in the 1928 New Zealand general election
New Zealand Labour Party politicians
New Zealand Members of the Order of the British Empire
Māori politicians